Jeremie Miller (born ) is the inventor of Jabber/XMPP technologies and was the primary developer of jabberd 1.0, the first XMPP server. He also wrote one of the first XML parsers in JavaScript. He began working on Jabber in 1998.

Biography
Miller is from Cascade, Iowa, and lives in Denver, Colorado.

Miller began developing the software on his farm in Iowa. He attended Iowa State University where he studied computer and electrical design. He broke off his studies early in 1995 to join an Internet startup company.

In May 2007, he was hired at Wikia to be technical lead for a project to create an open search engine called Wikia Search.
Miller co-founded a company called Singly in 2010, which announced the Locker Project in 2011 and TeleHash projects.

Singly was acquired by Appcelerator in August 2013 on undisclosed terms.

References

External links 
 , Robert McMillan, Linux Magazine, November 15, 2001
 The Locker Project: data for the people, Tish Shute, Radar O'Reilly, February 2011
 Creator of Instant Messaging Protocol to Launch App Platform for Your Life, Marshall Kirkpatrick, February 3, 2011

American computer programmers
1975 births
Living people
People from Iowa
People from Cascade, Iowa